Filipe de Carvalho Pinto da Cruz, best known as Filipe Cruz (born 7 September 1969) is a former Angolan handball player and a current handball coach of Primeiro de Agosto and the Angolan national team.

As a coach, Filipe has been the head coach of the Angola men's national handball team since 2010, which he qualified for the 2017 World Men's Handball Championship, by finishing third in the 2016 African Men's Handball Championship, before qualifying the junior team to the 2015 Men's Junior World Handball Championship. In April 2016, he was appointed head coach of the Angola women's national handball team, ahead of the 2016 Summer Olympics tournament in Rio de Janeiro, a position he will serve alongside his current position as the men's team head coach.

As a player, Cruz has played for Portuguese side ABC Braga from 1997 to 2002.

He is also the head coach of Primeiro de Agosto men's handball team.

References

1969 births
Living people
Handball players from Luanda
Angolan handball coaches
Angolan male handball players
Handball coaches of international teams